A  meat grinder (also called a "meat mincer" in the UK) is a kitchen appliance for fine chopping ('mincing') and/or mixing of raw or cooked meat, fish, vegetables or similar food.  It replaces tools like the mincing knife (which are also used in the preparation of minced meat, filling, etc.). The food to be minced is placed into a funnel, which sits on top of the grinder. From there, the material enters a horizontal screw conveyor; the screw conveyor may be hand-cranked or powered by an electric motor. The screw squashes and mixes the food. At the end of the screw, the food is passed through a fixed plate, where it exits the machine. The fineness of the minced food depends on the size of the holes in the plate.

By changing the hole plate it is also possible to produce breadcrumbs or fill sausage casing. After the drop from the retainer, it is possible to change the hole plate. By removing the fixing screw the grinder can be disassembled completely for cleaning.  Besides the domestic manually or motor operated grinders, there are also grinders for butchery (table- or shop-grinders for example) and for the food industry.  Some large machines are able to produce several tons per hour.

History
The first meat grinder was invented in the nineteenth century by Karl Drais. The earliest form of the meat grinder was hand-cranked and forced meat into a metal plate that had several small holes, resulting in long, thin strands of meat. 

Manufacturers developed powered machines as electricity became more accessible, and modern electric meat grinders can process several pounds of meat easily and uniformly. Some models have different attachments to add functionality, such as sausage-making, kibbe, and juicing, which have greatly broadened the way meat grinders are used.

Mixer unit

A basic optional feature for larger grinders is the mixer unit. With this unit different kinds of meat (for example beef or pork) can be mixed with each other homogeneously and/or the meat can be mixed with additives, like salt or spices, before grinding it.
Without such a mixer unit, the additives must be mixed into the meat after grinding it, which adversely affects the taste and appearance of most products. Salt is used especially to reduce the concentration of bacteria which preserves it for a longer time and gives a salty taste.

Commercial vs. home use 
Commercial meat grinders are used to process thousands of pounds of meat per hour.

There are 2 different drive forms used in industrial meat grinders, a single-rev drive, which is ideal to grind frozen meat blocks using a single auger, and a two-rev drive, which pushes the product through a cutting knife using an auger and then through a perforated plate. 

The frozen meat gets pushed by the auger into the star-shaped cutting blade. Once it has been cut, it gets pushed through a second cutting surface, the plate. The plate will further reduce the size of the product and will remove/break up any fat deposits. An example of a very common industrial meat grinder would be the Hobart 48/22 Meat Grinder.

See also
 Food processor
 Ground beef

References

Food preparation appliances
Garde manger
Ground meat